Haren railway station is a railway station on line 26 of the Belgian railway network, situated in Haren, part of the City of Brussels in the Brussels-Capital Region, Belgium.

Close to the station, and also in Haren, is Haren-South railway station, on line 36.

Train services
The station is served by the following services:
Brussels RER services (S5) Mechelen - Brussels-Luxembourg - Etterbeek - Halle - Enghien (- Geraardsbergen) (weekdays)
Brussels RER services (S5) Mechelen - Brussels-Luxembourg - Etterbeek - Halle  (weekends)
Brussels RER services (S7) Vilvoorde - Merode - Halle (weekdays)

References

Railway stations in Brussels
City of Brussels
Railway stations opened in 1978